The Krivichs (Kryvichs) were a tribal union of Early East Slavs between the 6th and the 12th centuries. It is suggested that originally the Krivichi were native to the area around Pskov. They migrated to the mostly Finnic areas in the upper reaches of the Volga, Dnieper, Dvina, areas south of the lower reaches of river Velikaya and parts of the Neman basin.

In some variants of Belarusiphile anti-normanist history, the city, and later principality of Polotsk is linked to Krivichians, much like Kyiv is linked to  Polianians, however, based on most modern evidence, these were all likely linked to Rus' people.

Etymology

Many historians suggest that the name of the tribe probably stems from that of their legendary forefather Kriv, possibly a kniaz or a voivode. According to Max Vasmer, this  sobriquet was derived from the Slavic adjective krivoy ("crooked/twisted") due to some possible birth defect. Jan Stankievič believed it was derived from the adjective "kroŭ", "kryvi" ("blood"), hence, "kryvič" would mean "blood relationship".

History

The Krivichs left many archaeological monuments, such as the remnants of agricultural settlements with traces of ironworks, jeweler's art, blacksmith's work and other handicrafts; long burial mounds of the 6th to 9th centuries with cremated bodies; burial mounds of rich warriors with weapons; sets of distinctive jewelry (bracelet-like temporal rings and glass beads made out of stretched wire). By the end of the first millennium, the Krivichs had already had well-developed farming and cattle-breeding. Having settled around the Trade route from the Varangians to the Greeks, the Krivichs traded with the Varangians. Their chief tribal centres were Gnezdovo, Izborsk, and Polotsk.

The Krivichs as a tribe took part in Oleg's and Igor's military campaigns against the Byzantine Empire. They are also mentioned in De Administrando Imperio as Krivitzoi (Κριβιτζοί).

Modern uses of the name
 Today, in Latvian, the word "Krievs" means Russian, and the word "Krievija" – Russia. Through Baltic territories, the word became known in Central Europe. For example, a German chronicler from Duisburg wrote in 1314: “Frater Henricus Marschalcus... venit ad terram Crivitae, et civitatem illam, quae parva Nogardia dicitur cepit”. And in a Polish publication "Kazanie na Pogrzeb Maryanny Korsakywnej" (Lublin, 1687. Б. II, 49) the Polotsk saint Paraxedis was called “Regina Krivitae” (the queen of the Kryvians).
 "Kryvich" ("Крывіч") was the name of a magazine that the Belarusian historian Vaclau Lastouski published in Kaunas from 1923 to 1927.
 KRIWI is the name of a Belarusian folk-rock band.
 Towns of Kreva and Kryvičy in modern Belarus are named after the tribe.

See also
 List of Medieval Slavic tribes

References

Krivichs